Cima di Castello is a mountain of the Bregaglia Range, located on the border between Italy and Switzerland. Its summit lies between the valleys of the Albigna and Forno Glacier (both in the Swiss canton of Graubünden) and the valley of Val Mello (in the Italian region of Lombardy).

References

External links
Cima di Castello on Summitpost
Cima di Castello on Hikr

Mountains of the Alps
Alpine three-thousanders
Mountains of Switzerland
Mountains of Italy
Mountains of Graubünden
Bregaglia